Peter Curtis may refer to:

Peter Theo Curtis (born 1968), American journalist held hostage in Syria by al-Nusra Front (2012–2014)
Peter Curtis (diplomat) (1929–2013), Australian public servant and diplomat
Norah Lofts (1904–1983), British author, one of whose pen names is Peter Curtis
Peter Curtis (tennis) (born 1945), former British tennis player
Sir Peter Curtis, 6th Baronet (1907–1976) of the Curtis baronets
Peter Curtis (footballer) (born 1933), Australian rules footballer

See also
Curtis (surname)